Denton Independent School District, sometimes shortened to Denton ISD, is a school district based in Denton, Texas. DISD's superintendent is Jamie Wilson.

In 2009, the school district was rated "academically acceptable" by the Texas Education Agency.

Attendance area 
The district covers the following:
 The majority of Denton
 Most of Cross Roads, Shady Shores
 Portions of: Aubrey, Bartonville, Copper Canyon, Corinth, Double Oak, Flower Mound, Little Elm, Oak Point, Prosper, Providence Village
It also covers the census-designated places of Lantana, Paloma Creek, Paloma Creek South, and Savannah.

It also includes the former Lincoln Park, now a part of Little Elm.

The district also serves the housing developments of Cross Oak Ranch, and Savannah, all located in unincorporated portions of Denton County.

List of facilities

Athletic facilities 
Bill Carrico Athletic Complex
C. H. Collins Athletic Complex
DISD Natatorium

Secondary schools 
Secondary schools are divided into two separate levels, middle and high schools. Middle School campuses serve students in grades 6–8 while Comprehensive High Schools serve students in grades 9–12.

Comprehensive high schools 

Braswell High School
Denton High School
John H. Guyer High School
Billy Ryan High School
Fred Moore High School

Middle schools 

Calhoun Middle School
Crownover Middle School – named after Ronny Crownover, businessman and politician
Harpool Middle School – located in Lantana; mascot Longhorns; colors orange and white
McMath Middle School – named after Carroll McMath, a Denton ISD teacher and band director from Lubbock, Texas and alumnus of Texas Tech University.
Navo Middle School
Rodriguez Middle School
Strickland Middle School – 1994–96 National Blue Ribbon School
Myers Middle School - Named after Bettye Myers, a public education advocate and community leader. This school was scheduled to open in August 2013.

Alternative  school (DAEP)
Lester Davis School (formerly Touchstone)

Primary schools

Elementary schools 
Alice Moore Alexander Elementary School - Named after a local education pioneer in Denton, TX. 
Dr. Annie Webb Blanton Elementary School - Named after Annie Webb, the first woman in Texas elected to a state office.
Catherine Coleman Bell Elementary School - Named after longtime Denton community member Catherine Bell, who was instrumental in the desegregation of Denton schools in the 1960s.
Cross Oaks Elementary School
Dorothy P. Adkins Elementary School - Named after former longtime Denton ISD teacher and school board member Dorothy P. Adkins, who was instrumental in the desegregation of Denton schools in the 1960s.
Eugenia Porter Rayzor Elementary School - Named after Eugenia Porter Rayzor, the wife of the late J. Newton Rayzor a well-known attorney and developer, and previous owner of the land where the school sits.
Eva Swan Hodge Elementary School - Named after a teacher at Fred Moore High School in the area of Home Economics.
Evers Park Elementary School
Frank Borman Elementary School - Named after Frank F. Borman, US Astronaut on Gemini 7 and Apollo 8 missions.
Ginnings Elementary School - Named after J.L. Ginnings, a local resident home builder whose family donated the land on which the campus stands.
L. A. Nelson Elementary School - Named after L.A. Nelson Jr., a Denton City Councilmember.
Ronald McNair Elementary School - Named after Ronald McNair, who was a mission specialist with NASA who died when the Space Shuttle Challenger exploded in 1986.
Mildred Hawk Elementary School - Named for Mildred Hawk, a local philanthropist and educational supporter.
Nette Schultz Elementary School - Named after Ms. Nette Shultz, an educator at Texas Woman's University
Newton Rayzor Elementary School - Named for J. Newton Rayzor, a well-known attorney and businessman who lived in Denton and whose family donated the land on which the campus stands.
Olive Stephens Elementary School - Named after Olive Stephens, the former mayor of Shady Shores who led the town for nearly four decades.
Paloma Creek Elementary School
Pecan Creek Elementary School
Providence Elementary School
Sam Houston Elementary School - Named after Sam Houston, who helped secure Texas’ independence and eventually was elected as the first President of the Republic of Texas.
 Sandbrock Ranch (In construction, expected to open 2022)
Savannah Elementary School
Tomàs Rivera Elementary School - Named after Tomás Rivera, a Mexican-American scholar, author, and poet.
Union Park Elementary School
Wayne Stuart Ryan Elementary School - Named after a successful businessman, rancher, and community leader.

Early childhood centers 
Ann Windle
Gonzalez

Denton ISD television channel 
Homes in the Denton ISD area get the Denton ISD channel on cable
Channel 31 on Charter Communications
Channel 40 on Frontier FiOS
Channel 88 on AT&T U-verse

See also 

 List of school districts in Texas

References

External links
 

 
Denton, Texas
School districts in Denton County, Texas